"Don't You Love Me" is a song by British R&B girl group Eternal. It was the second single to be released from their third studio album, Before the Rain (1997). The song's lyrics deal with child neglect and abuse and features the London  Community Gospel Choir on backing vocals. It peaked at number three on the UK Singles Chart in March 1997, becoming the group's tenth top-10 entry on the chart.

Critical reception
British magazine Music Week rated the song four out of five, writing, "Unusually opening like a second cousin of The Persuaders theme, this breaks into one of Eternal's strongest singles yet. Its powerful, rounder sound hints at a more mature musical direction for the forthcoming new album." Editor Alan Jones described "Don't You Love Me" as "a classy mid-tempo pop/R&B song hanging on a slightly changed but otherwise familiar bassline from the Dennis Edwards hit Don't Look Any Further." He added, "Quite haunting and not even spoilt by a kid's chorus which appears as the record heads for the fade." Ian Hyland from Sunday Mirror commented, "Before Spice Girls, Eternal were the most successful girl group in Britain - but they're not bitter. In fact, as this single shows, Eternal are better. A great taster for their next album, 'Don't You Love Me', this proves that when it comes to R'n'B the girls are up there with En Vogue. A definite hit, there's even a cheesy Charlie's Angels CD cover."

Track listings

 UK CD1
 "Don't You Love Me" (radio mix)
 "I'll Take a Pass on Love"
 "This Life's Not for Me"

 UK CD2 and Australian CD single
 "Don't You Love Me" (radio mix)
 "Don't You Love Me" (Blacksmith remix)
 "Don't You Love Me" (Ronnie Size mix)
 "Don't You Love Me" (Mark's Dream House vocal)
 "Don't You Love Me" (Tony De Vit Trade mix)

 UK cassette single
 "Don't You Love Me" (radio mix)
 "This Life's Not for Me"
 "Don't You Love Me" (Mark's Dream House vocal)

 European CD single
 "Don't You Love Me" (radio mix)
 "Don't You Love Me" (Mark's Dream House vocal)

Charts

Weekly charts

Year-end charts

References

1996 songs
1997 singles
Eternal (band) songs
EMI Records singles
First Avenue Records singles
Songs written by Cynthia Biggs